Koriun (reformed spelling: Կորյուն; also transliterated as Koriwn, Koryun) was the earliest Armenian-language author. Writing in the fifth century, his Life of Mashtots contains many details about the evangelization of Armenia and the invention of the Armenian alphabet by Mesrop Mashtots. Some Armenian and European scholars, such as G. Alishan, O. Torosyan, G. Fintigliyan, A. Sarukhan, G. Ter-Mkrtchyan (Miaban), S. Weber and others, have speculated that Koriun could have been Iberian-Armenian or Iberian (Georgian). According to Armenian and European scholars, Koriun was elevated to the rank of bishop of Iberia. Having received his early education under Mashtots, Koriun went to Byzantium for higher studies, returning to Armenia with other students in 432. He was a close friend of Eznik of Kolb and Ghevond. Later, he was appointed Bishop of Georgia. He has been listed among the junior translators. His style is original, but somewhat obscure due to grammatical irregularities. To him have been attributed the translations of the three apocryphal books of the Maccabees. Koryun was the origin of the claim that the Georgian alphabet was created by Mashtots.

After the death of Mashtots, Koryun was tasked by Hovsep Hoghotsmetsi, one of the spiritual leaders at that time, to start writing Mesrop's biography. Now his work is known as "Varq Mashtotsi" (Life of Mashtots). He finished his work before the Avarayr battle in 451 and new political developments in the region. In the modern period it was translated into Russian, English, French and German.

References

Sources

Further reading
 
 The Life of Mashtots' by His Disciple Koriwn. — Oxford University Press, 2023

5th-century Armenian historians